The 24th World Acrobatic Gymnastics Championships were held in Levallois-Perret, France at the Palais des Sports Marcel-Cerdan from July 10 to July 12, 2014. 21 countries took part in the competition.

Medallists

Results

Women's Pairs

The women's pair event took place on July 11.

Men's Pairs

The men's pair event took place on July 11.

Mixed Pairs

The mixed pairs event was held on July 12.

Women's Group

The women's group event was held on July 12.

Men's Group

The men's group event was held on July 12.

Participating nations
21 nations entered the competition.

References

External links

 Event website
 Official results

 
Acrobatic Gymnastics World Championships
Acrobatic Gymnastics World Championships
2014 in French sport
Sport in Hauts-de-Seine
International gymnastics competitions hosted by France